Jennifer Whitehead (born 7 March 1977) is an American volleyball player and coach.

She played for the United States women's national volleyball team at the 2001 FIVB Women's World Grand Champions Cup.

She played for Michigan State University, and the University of Florida.
She coached for the USA Youth National Team, and Long Island University.

References 

Living people
1977 births
American women's volleyball players
Michigan State Spartans women's volleyball players
Florida Gators women's volleyball players
American volleyball coaches
LIU Brooklyn Blackbirds women's volleyball coaches